Solo Jebres Station, also known as Jebres Station, is a type-C large class railway station in Surakarta, Central Java, Indonesia. It is one of the major railway stations in the city.

Before Purwosari Station was used as a stop and terminus for economy- and mixed-class intercity trains in Surakarta, all such types of trains crossing the northern and southern Java lines stopped at this station. Since 1 February 2014 trains are no longer start and end their journey at the station. All train journeys are diverted to Purwosari and Solo Balapan stations as the terminus and the train stops in Surakarta are on the southern Java line, while Solo Jebres Station is used as a stop for passenger trains that pass through central Java line, the -Solo Balapan line or vice versa.

History 

In contrast to other stations located on the Staatsspoorwegen (SS) line, Solo Jebres station was built on the former Nederlandsch-Indische Spoorweg Maatschappij (NIS) line, running in conjunction with the Samarang–Vorstenlanden railway line. There are not much sources discussing any line that ends on the banks of the Solo River — only the 1869 map that shows its existence, but it was never discussed. The line crosses the territory of Surakarta Sunanate.

In 1882–1884, the SS carried out the development of the line, although the line was constructed from Surabaya to Madiun, until it ended at Solo Balapan. On 24 May 1884, the former NIS line was replaced with a new SS line, and Solo Jebres Station was opened.

Services 
The following is a list of passenger train services at the Solo Jebres Station.

Intercity trains 
Executive class
 Brawijaya, to Jakarta– and to  via  and 

Economy class
 Matarmaja, to Jakarta– and to  via  and 

Mixed class

Commuter rail 

Bus connection 
The Jebres bus stops of Batik Solo Trans is located near the station, serving Corridors 1 and 3.

Footnotes

References 

Buildings and structures in Surakarta
Railway stations in Central Java